The 1993 FIVB Women's U20 World Championship was held in Brasília and Campinas, Brazil from August 13 to 22, 1993. 16 teams participated in the tournament.

Qualification process

 * Germany replaced Russia.
 ** Hungary replaced Czechoslovakia.
 *** Japan replaced Australia.

Pools composition

Preliminary round

Pool A

|}

|}

Pool B

|}

|}

Pool C

|}

|}

Pool D

|}

|}

Second round

Pool E

|}

|}

Pool F

|}

|}

Final round

Championship round

Semifinals

|}

Bronze medal match

|}

Gold medal match

|}

Final standing

Individual awards

MVP:  Taismary Aguero
Best Spiker:  Olga Kolomiyets
Best Blocker:  Regla Torres
Best Server:  Taismary Aguero
Best Setter:  Taismary Aguero
Best Receiver:  Victoria Ilarionova
Best Digger:  Lee Mi-Jung

External links
 Informative website.

World Championship
Women's U20 Volleyball World Championship
FIVB Volleyball Women's U20 World Championship
FIVB Women's Junior World Championship
FIVB Women's Junior World Championship
1993 in youth sport